Henri Welschinger (1846–1919) was a French historian, journalist, and litterateur.

Biography 
Henri Welschinger was born on February 2, 1846, in Muttersholtz, a small village located eight kilometers from Sélestat, in the Bas-Rhin, France. He was educated at the petit seminaire of Notre-Dame-des-Champs in Paris where he received a classical education (Greek, Latin, Logic, Math).  He began his career as an archivist at the National Assembly in 1867. Then, he was employed in the highest offices of the Senate. He was director of the law-drafting, the legislative printing and the cabinet minutes. He lived in the Luxembourg Palace for forty-two years. He was elected member of the Academy of Moral and Political Sciences in 1907, later holding the chair in philosophy and the history there.

Henri Welschinger died on November 3, 1919 in Viroflay, at age 73.

Works 
  Le Duc d'Enghien, 1772-1804 (1888)
  Le Maréchal Ney, 1815 (1893)

References

Bibliography 
 

1846 births
1919 deaths
20th-century French historians
19th-century French historians